Hello Chapter 3: Hello, Strange Time is the third extended play by South Korean boy group CIX. It was released on October 27, 2020 by C9 Entertainment. The album consists of five tracks, including the title track, "Jungle".

Background, release and promotion 
On May 31, 2020, CIX announced the release of their third extended play Hello Chapter 3: Hello, Strange Time, along with a comeback schedule containing the dates of sequential teasers following up to the release of the album release set on June 30, 2020. On June 3, the group photo teaser for the album was released. From June 8 to June 12, individual teaser photos of the band members were released. On June 13, the music video teaser of the lead single, "Jungle" was released. From June 15 to June 19, individual teaser videos of the band members were released.

On June 24, 2020, CIX's company, C9 entertainment, gave an official statement that a group member, Bae Jinyoung had injured his ankle during a practice session. It was announced, due to his injury the release and promotions of the album will be postponed.
  
On October 15, 2020, CIX released the schedule of the new comeback date for their third extended play. On October 19, the second music video teaser was released. On October 26, the group released a performance video teaser. On October 27, the album and an accompanying music video for the lead single, "Jungle" was released.

Track listing

Charts

Release history

References 

Korean-language EPs
CIX (band) albums
2020 EPs